Iñaki is a male given name. It is a neologism created by Sabino Arana meaning Ignatius, to be a Basque language analog to "Ignacio" in Spanish, "Ignace" in French, and "Ignazio" in Italian, and an alternative to the names Eneko and Iñigo.

Notable people 
 Iñaki Anasagasti - Spanish politician
 Iñaki Astiz Ventura - Spanish footballer
 Iñaki Azkuna - Spanish politician and former mayor of Bilbao
 Iñaki Bea Jauregi - Spanish footballer
 Iñaki Bonillas - Mexican artist
 Iñaki de Juana Chaos - Spanish separatist
 Iñaki Descarga - Spanish footballer
 Iñaki Egaña - Spanish musician
 Iñaki Gabilondo - Spanish journalist
 Iñaki Gastón - Spanish cyclist
 Iñaki Goitia Peña - Spanish footballer
 Iñaki Isasi - Spanish cyclist
 Iñaki Lafuente - Spanish footballer
 Iñaki Mallona Txertudi - Puerto Rican Roman Catholic bishop
 Iñaki Muñoz - Spanish footballer
 Iñaki Ochoa de Olza - Spanish mountain climber
Iñaki Peña, Footballer
 Iñaki Plaza Murga - Spanish musician
 Iñaki Ruiz de Pinedo - Spanish politician
 Iñaki Sáez - Spanish footballer
 Iñaki Urdangarin - Spanish handballer and the former Duke of Palma de Mallorca.
 Iñaki Williams - Spanish footballer

External links 
Behind the Name
Euskaltzaindia

Basque masculine given names